This is list of members of the Argentine Senate from 10 December 2013 to 9 December 2015.

Composition
as of 9 December 2015

Senate leadership

Election cycles

List of senators

Notes

References

External links
List on the official website (archived) 

2013-2015
2013 in Argentina
2014 in Argentina
2015 in Argentina